The light novel series Full Metal Panic! by Shoji Gatoh was adapted into Japanese manga on several occasions. The first series, entitled Full Metal Panic!, was serialized in Kadokawa Shoten's magazine Monthly Comic Dragon by Retsu Tateo. All the adaptations focus on the paramilitary counter-terrorist force Mithril's Sergeant Sousuke Sagara, who arrives to the Jindai High School. There, he is assigned to protect the high school student, Kaname Chidori, while also acting as a student. Bodyguarding Chidori, Sousuke starts having social interactions for the first time in his life, but sometimes he is also assigned to do missions for Mithril.

The first Full Metal Panic! manga was collected in nine tankōbon volumes published from August 30, 2000 to June 29, 2005. Full Metal Panic! was one of the first manga licensed by ADV Manga, being announced in July 2003. They released all of its volumes from November 10, 2003 to April 11, 2006. A parallel series, entitled , was also illustrated by Retsu Tateo and is a reorganisation of the chapters from the first manga series. Seven volumes were published from November 1, 2003 to September 1, 2006.

It was released in five volumes from January 30, 2001 to April 1, 2003. Overload! was licensed by ADV Manga in December 2004, and all of its volumes were published in English from June 6, 2005 to May 24, 2006. Nagai also wrote  which is a single tankōbon manga published on June 27, 2003 focused more on the action elements from the franchise. The sequel of the first manga series, was illustrated by Hiroshi Ueda and focuses on the missions of Sousuke as a sergeant. It has been published in nineteen volumes, with the first volume published on August 1, 2005 and the last volume published on September 20, 2013. Its events are based on the fourth Full Metal Panic! light novel onwards.

Volume list

Full Metal Panic!

Full Metal Panic! Overload!

Full Metal Panic! Surplus

Full Metal Panic! Comic Mission

Full Metal Panic! Sigma

Full Metal Panic! Another

Full Metal Panic! 0 ―ZERO―

Full Metal Panic! Another Sigma

References

 
Lists of manga volumes and chapters